The Charity Golf Classic was a golf tournament on the LPGA Tour from 1973 to 1975. It was played at the Woodhaven Country Club in Fort Worth, Texas. Sandra Haynie won all three editions of the event.

Winners
1975 Sandra Haynie
1974 Sandra Haynie
1973 Sandra Haynie

References

External links
Tournament results at Golfobserver.com

Former LPGA Tour events
Golf in Texas
Sports in Fort Worth, Texas
Recurring sporting events established in 1973
Recurring events disestablished in 1975
1973 establishments in Texas
1975 disestablishments in Texas
Women's sports in Texas